Rek-Vee Industries or Rekvee Industries was a customized recreational vehicle/Motorhome manufacturer and for a short time a transit bus manufacturer in the 1970s. The company was based in Scarborough, Ontario.

Products
 Rekvee Funcraft RV - classic RV built in the 1970s
 Club Car - used a Funcraft motorhome bodies on Dodge RM-350 and built with UTDC and Funcraft Industries Limited for various operators from 1973 to 1975 for dial-a-bus operations
 multi-purpose small bus - paratransit concept using the Club Car fitted with lift ramp

Funcraft RV
A bus frame used to build a RV. Instead of it being metal bumpers, they had metal in between fiberglass. Most Rekvee Funcraft vehicles came with bunk beds and a working shower. It is unknown how many still exist.
Source:

Clients

 Kingston Transit
 Toronto Transit Commission - 6 second hand Club Car units from GO Transit 1975-1976 for Glenorchy route
 Brampton Transit
 GO Transit - 1973 to 1976 for Go-Dial-A-Bus demo
 Hamilton Street Railway
 Mississauga Transit
 OC Transpo - Tele-Transpo service (dial-a-bus) mid 1970s

References

Bus manufacturers of Canada
Manufacturing companies based in Toronto
Companies based in Scarborough, Toronto